Miguel Arellano (2 March 1941 – 10 May 2021) was a Mexican basketball player who competed in the 1964 Summer Olympics and in the 1968 Summer Olympics. He was born in Zacatecas City.

References

1941 births
2021 deaths
Mexican men's basketball players
1967 FIBA World Championship players
Olympic basketball players of Mexico
Basketball players at the 1964 Summer Olympics
Basketball players at the 1968 Summer Olympics
Basketball players at the 1967 Pan American Games
Pan American Games medalists in basketball
Pan American Games silver medalists for Mexico
People from Zacatecas City
Basketball players from Zacatecas
Medalists at the 1967 Pan American Games